In infrared astronomy, the M band is an atmospheric transmission window centred on 4.7 micrometres (in the mid-infrared).

Electromagnetic spectrum
Infrared imaging